"Pretty Fly for a Rabbi" (alternatively called "Pretty Fly (For a Rabbi)" in Australia) is a song by "Weird Al" Yankovic. It is a parody of "Pretty Fly (For a White Guy)" by The Offspring, and it was released from the 1999 album Running with Scissors. The song was released as a single exclusively in Australia. Tress MacNeille  performs the line "How ya doin' Bernie?", and appears in the music video. Voice actress Mary Kay Bergman also contributes with the "For a rabbi!" line near the middle of the song.

As opposed to the phrase "Gunter Glieben Glauten Globen" in the original song, Weird Al starts this song with the Yiddish sentence "Veren zol fun dir a blintsa" meaning "You should turn into a blintz." At one point, Yankovic references the line "Mecca lecca hi, mecca hiney hiney ho" and "Mecca-lecca hi mecca lecca chahney ho!", catchphrases of Jambi, the wish-granting disembodied head from Pee-Wee's Playhouse.

Track listing
Australian single
 "Pretty Fly for a Rabbi" – 3:02
 "Amish Paradise" – 3:20

Music video
A "music video" for the song was assembled for the singles release in Australia. Yankovic stated that his Australian record company decided to release "Pretty Fly for a Rabbi" as a single and they insisted on releasing a video to go along with it. He decided against the idea, but told them that they could make one themselves by cutting together bits from "Weird Al" Yankovic Live!, which they did.

Charts

References

"Weird Al" Yankovic songs
1999 singles
Jewish comedy and humor
Songs with lyrics by "Weird Al" Yankovic
Songs written by Dexter Holland
1999 songs
Volcano Entertainment singles